Martin Leslie  may refer to:

 Martin Leslie (Australian footballer) (born 1962), former Australian rules footballer
 Martin Leslie (rugby union) (born 1971), New Zealand born former professional rugby union player who played international rugby for Scotland